George V. Finnegan (September 28, 1881 – February 28, 1913) was an American bantamweight and flyweight boxer who competed in the early twentieth century. He died in San Francisco, California.

Finnegan won two medals in Boxing at the 1904 Summer Olympics, a gold medal in the flyweight category and a silver medal against fellow American, Oliver Kirk in the bantamweight category in which he gained several pounds in several days. Finnegan remains only one of four boxers in boxing history to win two different medals at the same Games.

References

External links
 George Finnegan's profile at databaseOlympics
 
 

1881 births
1913 deaths
Bantamweight boxers
Flyweight boxers
Olympic boxers of the United States
Boxers at the 1904 Summer Olympics
Olympic gold medalists for the United States in boxing
Olympic silver medalists for the United States in boxing
Place of birth missing
American male boxers
Medalists at the 1904 Summer Olympics